Final Blow is a boxing arcade video game released in 1988 by Taito. The name remained the same for all ported platforms, except for the Sega Genesis versions, which Sega released outside Japan as James 'Buster' Douglas Knockout Boxing featuring Buster Douglas himself in 1990 immediately after his upset victory over Mike Tyson.

Plot
The game follows a single season boxing championship run. There are five fictional fighters competing: Dynamite Joe - The Miracle Fighter, Fernando Gomez - The South American Eagle, Kim Nang - The Korean Comet, King Jason - The Black King, and The Detroit Kid - The Invincible Black Panther.

Gameplay
The game is a side-scrolling boxing game where the player moves left and right to control a screen sized boxer. When the timing is right, the player can unleash a final blow punch which can sometimes KO the opponent in a single strike.

The home versions contain a spectator mode where the player can watch their favorite boxers compete.

The Sega Genesis port adds two boxers: James Buster Douglas (who uses The Detroit Kid's graphics, slightly edited and palette swapped) and Ironhead. It was one of the games used as part of the Genesis Does Campaign, particularly since Nintendo used Mike Tyson for its Mike Tyson's Punch-Out!! video game, whom Douglas had challenged and defeated that year.

Reception

In Japan, Game Machine listed Final Blow on their June 1, 1989 issue as being the third most-successful table arcade unit of the month.

Mega placed the game at #9 in their list of the 10 Worst Mega Drive Games of All Time.

References

External links

Final Blow at Atari Mania

1988 video games
Amiga games
Arcade video games
Sega Genesis games
Atari ST games
Commodore 64 games
FM Towns games
Boxing video games
Romstar games
Sanritsu Denki games
Video games based on real people
Cultural depictions of boxers
Cultural depictions of American men
Taito arcade games
Video games developed in Japan